Anthene radiata, the red-edged ciliate blue, is a butterfly in the family Lycaenidae. It is found in Sierra Leone, Liberia, Ivory Coast and Ghana. The habitat consists of moist primary forests.

References

Butterflies described in 1910
Anthene